D. gigantea may refer to:
 Dasyatis gigantea, the giant stumptail stingray, a fish species
 Dendroseris gigantea, a flowering plant species found only in Chile
 Dinocrocuta gigantea, an extinct hyena-like feliform carnivore species that lived in Asia and Africa during the Miocene epoch
 Dinoponera gigantea, the world's largest species of ant found only in South America
 Drechslera gigantea, a plant pathogen that causes eyespot disease on many host plants
 Drosera gigantea, the giant sundew, an erect perennial tuberous plant species

See also 
 Gigantea (disambiguation)